Phillip Keith Newell  (30 January 1930 – 24 April 2022) was an Australian Anglican bishop who served as Bishop of Tasmania from 1982 to 2000. 

Newell was born on 30 January 1930. He was educated at the University of Melbourne. After working as a mathematics teacher and tutor in physics, from 1958 Newell studied for ordination as a residential student at Trinity College Theological School, Melbourne, winning the Henty Theological Studentship. He became a priest in 1960. He was successively curate of St James', King Street, Sydney, rector of Christ Church, St Lucia, Brisbane, a canon residentiary of St John's Cathedral, Brisbane and finally (before being elected to the episcopate) Archdeacon of Lilley. He was consecrated a bishop on 24 August 1982.

In January 2016, Newell was accused of covering up for and further promoting convicted paedophile priest Louis Daniels at hearings of the Royal Commission into Institutional Responses to Child Sexual Abuse. Newell denied any cover up yet told the Commission that he apologised "from the bottom of my heart" for any harm his actions may have caused.

In 1993, Newell was appointed an Officer of the Order of Australia in the 1993 Australia Day Honours for "service to religion as Bishop of Tasmania, to education and the community".

Newell was married to Merle for 62 years. He died on 24 April 2022, at the age of 92.

References 

1930 births
2022 deaths
20th-century Anglican bishops in Australia
Anglican bishops of Tasmania
Archdeacons of Lilley
Officers of the Order of Australia
People educated at Trinity College (University of Melbourne)
Religious leaders from Melbourne
University of Melbourne alumni